Handball at the 2007 Southeast Asian Games took place at the Nimibutr Gymnasium at the National Sport Complex, Bangkok, Thailand.

Medal table

Medalists

External links
Southeast Asian Games Official Results

2007 Southeast Asian Games events
2007 in handball